Nonlinear Processes in Geophysics is an open-access peer-reviewed scientific journal publishing research within Earth science.

Abstracting and indexing  
This journal is indexed in the following databases:

According to the Journal Citation Reports, the journal has a 2020 impact factor of 1.740.

References

External links 
 

Earth and atmospheric sciences journals
Publications established in 1994
English-language journals
Open access journals
Creative Commons Attribution-licensed journals
European Geosciences Union academic journals
Copernicus Publications academic journals